Anastasia Filenko (born 1 November 1990) is a Ukrainian footballer who plays as a defender and has appeared for the Ukraine women's national team.

Career
Filenko has been capped for the Ukraine national team, appearing for the team during the 2019 FIFA Women's World Cup qualifying cycle.

References

External links
 
 
 

1990 births
Living people
Women's association football defenders
Ukrainian women's footballers
Ukraine women's international footballers
Gintra Universitetas players
WFC Lehenda-ShVSM Chernihiv players
Ukrainian expatriate footballers
Ukrainian expatriate sportspeople in Belarus
Ukrainian expatriate sportspeople in Russia
Ukrainian expatriate sportspeople in Estonia
Expatriate footballers in Estonia
Ukrainian expatriate sportspeople in Lithuania
Expatriate women's footballers in Lithuania